The 2012 FIVB Volleyball World League qualification was a qualification tournament to determine the final two spots for the 2012 World League. It was held from 29 July to 21 August 2011.

Teams

* Because of 15th place  to play all its 2011 World League matches abroad due to the nuclear and radiation concerns in Japan, FIVB decided to guarantee Japan a vacancy in the 2012 edition.
**  beat  3–1 (25–22, 22–25, 25–18, 25–19) in the Asian Qualifier in Taicang, China on 11 July 2011.

Pool standing procedure
 Match points
 Number of matches won
 Sets ratio
 Points ratio
 Result of the last match between the tied teams

Match won 3–0 or 3–1: 3 match points for the winner, 0 match points for the loser
Match won 3–2: 2 match points for the winner, 1 match point for the loser

First round
All times are local.

Playoff 1

|}

|}

Playoff 2

|}

|}

Second round
All times are local.

Playoff 1

|}

|}

Playoff 2

|}

|}

References

External links
Official website

FIVB Volleyball World League
Qualification for volleyball competitions
2011 in volleyball